Veterans Outer Loop is a major bypass route in Glasgow, Kentucky. It is maintained by the Kentucky Transportation Cabinet (KYTC).

Route description
With a state route designation of Kentucky Route 3600 (KY 3600), the road begins at an intersection with KY 1297 (Old Bowling Green Road) near the exit 8 interchange of the Louie B. Nunn Cumberland Parkway before meeting the concurrently running U.S. Route 68 and KY 80, as well as US 68 Bus. It carries US 68 for its course from West Main Street/Bowling Green Road to the other US 68/US 68 Bus. intersection on the east side of town at Edmonton Road/Columbia Avenue. From there, it carries KY 1519 on the east side of Glasgow over Cumberland Parkway, and it ends at an at-grade intersection with KY 1307.

History
Construction of the outer loop began in the early 2000s, beginning with the section from US 68 (Bowling Green Road) to KY 90 (Happy Valley Road) to US 31E (Jackson Highway) on the west and north sides of Glasgow, which was completed in 2004. This first section was originally designated KY 3160. During the 2010/11 fiscal year, the road was extended to include another intersection with US 68, a new exit 15 interchange for Cumberland Parkway on the east side of town, ending with an intersection with KY 1307. When that extension was completed in 2012, the KY 3160 designation was retired when US 68 was rerouted onto the Outer Loop, and the original US 68 through Glasgow became US 68 Business.

On May 28, 2015, the Veterans Outer Loop was extended on Glasgow's west side. Construction of the extension began in late 2014. The extension traveled from the original western terminus to an intersection with Old Bowling Green Road (KY 1297). The project also included a new interchange on Cumberland Parkway at mile marker 8.8, just east of Beaver Creek (a tributary of the Barren River), signed as exit 8. Once the new extension had been completed, the KYTC designated the western extension KY 3600.

Major intersections

Kentucky Route 1519

Kentucky Route 1519 (KY 1519) is a state highway in Barren County, Kentucky, that is the final  of the Veterans Outer Loop. It starts at a junction with KY 1307, intersects the Louie B. Nunn Cumberland Parkway at its exit 15 interchange, and it ends at  U.S. Route 68 (US 68) and KY 80 (Edmonton Road) on the east side of Glasgow. The Veterans Outer Loop continues as US 68 westbound.

See also

References

External links
Kentucky Transportation Cabinet
Glasgow-Barren County Chamber of Commerce
Glasgow Outer Loop at KentuckyRoads.com

1519
1519
U.S. Highways in Kentucky
U.S. Route 68
Kentucky Route 80
Beltways in the United States